Archibald Randall (May 24, 1797 – June 8, 1846) was a United States district judge of the United States District Court for the Eastern District of Pennsylvania.

Education and career

Born in Philadelphia, Pennsylvania, Randall read law to enter the bar in 1818. He was in private practice in Philadelphia from 1820 to 1842. He was a clerk for the Philadelphia Select Council from 1830 to 1833. He was a Judge of the Court of Common Pleas for the First Judicial District from 1834 to 1842.

Federal judicial service

On March 3, 1842, Randall was nominated by President John Tyler to a seat on the United States District Court for the Eastern District of Pennsylvania vacated by Judge Joseph Hopkinson. Randall was confirmed by the United States Senate on March 8, 1842, and received his commission the same day, serving until his death on June 8, 1846, in Philadelphia.

References

Sources
 

1797 births
1846 deaths
Lawyers from Philadelphia
Judges of the Pennsylvania Courts of Common Pleas
Judges of the United States District Court for the Eastern District of Pennsylvania
United States federal judges appointed by John Tyler
19th-century American judges
United States federal judges admitted to the practice of law by reading law